Daraj-e Bala may refer to:
Daraj
Darj-e Bala